The meridian 98° west of Greenwich is a line of longitude that extends from the North Pole across the Arctic Ocean, North America, the Pacific Ocean, the Southern Ocean, and Antarctica to the South Pole.

The 98th meridian west forms a great circle with the 82nd meridian east.

From Pole to Pole
Starting at the North Pole and heading south to the South Pole, the 98th meridian west passes through:

{| class="wikitable plainrowheaders"
! scope="col" width="120" | Co-ordinates
! scope="col" | Country, territory or sea
! scope="col" | Notes
|-
| style="background:#b0e0e6;" | 
! scope="row" style="background:#b0e0e6;" | Arctic Ocean
| style="background:#b0e0e6;" | Passing just west of the Fay Islands, Nunavut,  (at )
|-
| 
! scope="row" | 
| Nunavut — Amund Ringnes Island
|-
| style="background:#b0e0e6;" | 
! scope="row" style="background:#b0e0e6;" | Hassel Sound
| style="background:#b0e0e6;" |
|-
| style="background:#b0e0e6;" | 
! scope="row" style="background:#b0e0e6;" | Unnamed waterbody
| style="background:#b0e0e6;" |
|-
| 
! scope="row" | 
| Nunavut — Loney Island and Bathurst Island
|-valign="top"
| style="background:#b0e0e6;" | 
! scope="row" style="background:#b0e0e6;" | Parry Channel
| style="background:#b0e0e6;" | Passing just east of Garrett Island, Nunavut,  (at ) Passing just west of Lowther Island, Nunavut,  (at )
|-
| 
! scope="row" | 
| Nunavut — Russell Island and Prince of Wales Island
|-
| style="background:#b0e0e6;" | 
! scope="row" style="background:#b0e0e6;" | Larsen Sound
| style="background:#b0e0e6;" |
|-
| 
! scope="row" | 
| Nunavut — King William Island
|-
| style="background:#b0e0e6;" | 
! scope="row" style="background:#b0e0e6;" | Simpson Strait
| style="background:#b0e0e6;" |
|-valign="top"
| 
! scope="row" | 
|-valign="top"
| 
! scope="row" | 
|-valign="top"
| 
! scope="row" | 
| Tamaulipas Veracruz — from  Hidalgo — from  Puebla — from  Tlaxcala — from  Puebla — from  Oaxaca — from 
|-
| style="background:#b0e0e6;" | 
! scope="row" style="background:#b0e0e6;" | Pacific Ocean
| style="background:#b0e0e6;" |
|-
| style="background:#b0e0e6;" | 
! scope="row" style="background:#b0e0e6;" | Southern Ocean
| style="background:#b0e0e6;" |
|-
| 
! scope="row" | Antarctica
| Unclaimed territory
|-
|}

United States
In his classic study of the Great Plains, Walter Prescott Webb described the 98th meridian as the dividing line between the arid western United States and the humid eastern United States:
As one contrasts the civilization of the Great Plains with that of the eastern timberland, one sees what may be called an institutional fault (comparable to a geological fault) running from middle Texas to Illinois or Dakota, roughly following the ninety-eighth meridian. At this fault the ways of life and of living changed. Practically every institution that was carried across it was either broken and remade or else greatly altered.
More commonly, the 100th meridian is cited as the approximate dividing line, following the earlier observations of John Wesley Powell in the late 1800s.

See also
97th meridian west
99th meridian west

References

w098 meridian west